Walter Javier Paz (born 4 March 1973 in Buenos Aires) is an Argentine footballer that plays as an attacking midfielder. He played for the Argentina Youth Squad in the 1991 FIFA World Youth Championship in which he was nominated the best midfielder.

He went to play on FC Porto but with no success. After some loan time in other European clubs he returned to Argentina where he played mostly for second division and lower table first division teams.

References

External links
 BDFA profile

1973 births
Living people
Footballers from Buenos Aires
Argentine footballers
Argentina under-20 international footballers
Argentina youth international footballers
Argentine expatriate footballers
Association football midfielders
Argentinos Juniors footballers
Tiro Federal footballers
All Boys footballers
Quilmes Atlético Club footballers
Club Atlético Huracán footballers
FC Porto players
Cobresal footballers
Gil Vicente F.C. players
Primera B de Chile players
Argentine Primera División players
Primeira Liga players
Expatriate footballers in Chile
Expatriate footballers in Portugal
Expatriate footballers in Scotland
Estudiantes de Río Cuarto footballers